34th Street is a major crosstown street in the New York City borough of Manhattan. It runs the width of Manhattan Island from West Side Highway on the West Side to the FDR Drive on the East Side. 34th Street is used as a crosstown artery between New Jersey to the west and Queens to the east, connecting the Lincoln Tunnel to New Jersey with the Queens–Midtown Tunnel to Long Island.

Several notable buildings are located directly along 34th Street, including the Empire State Building, Macy's Herald Square, and Javits Center. Other structures, such as Pennsylvania Station, are located within one block of 34th Street.  The street is served by the crosstown M34/M34A bus routes and contains several subway stops.

History

In April 2010, the New York City Department of Transportation proposed to add bus rapid transit along the 34th Street corridor. To create exclusive lanes for buses, the street would be converted to one-way westbound operation west of Sixth Avenue and one-way eastbound operation east of Fifth Avenue; a pedestrian plaza would be created between Fifth and Sixth avenues. The street was eventually kept in two-way operation.

There was a mass shooting in 2012; Designer Jeffrey Johnson shot and killed his colleague and others outside 34th Street and Fifth Avenue.

Description 
At the west end of the street one finds the Hudson River, the West Midtown Ferry Terminal, the West 30th Street Heliport, the Hudson River Greenway, the West Side Highway, and the Jacob K. Javits Convention Center, New York City's main convention center. On the West Side, 34th Street is in the Hell's Kitchen neighborhood, at the north end of the West Side Yard. Until 2017 the southwest corner at Tenth Avenue had McDonald's with a drive-thru and a small parking lot, a rarity in Manhattan.  On Ninth is B&H Photo Video, a large retailer of photographic and electronic equipment.

Further east at Eighth and 33rd, the James Farley Post Office and Penn Station dominate on the south side of the street, serving Amtrak trains to destinations all over the United States and Canada, and Long Island Rail Road and New Jersey Transit trains to suburbs. Above Penn Station sits Madison Square Garden, which calls itself "the world's most famous arena". The grand stairs of the James Farley Post Office are built on the scale of the former Penn Station. The architecture of the post office gives a flavor of what the area was like in the height of the railroad era.

34th Street is a major shopping street. Though it endured a decline in the 1970s, it rebounded late in the 20th century with new stores and new energy. There is a large video board and light display at 34th Street and Seventh Avenue. The block between Seventh Avenue and Broadway is Macy's Herald Square, the famous department store immortalized in the Christmas movie Miracle on 34th Street and taglined as the "world's largest store". The annual Macy's Thanksgiving Day Parade ends on 34th Street. Branches of large chain stores also operate between 8th and 5th Avenues.

East of Herald Square and the hectic shopping district, the influence of the East Side and the sedate corporate office towers of the neighborhoods Kips Bay and Murray Hill starts to take hold. On Fifth Avenue one finds the Empire State Building. The second tallest building in the city, it stands on a rare ledge of solid Manhattan schist dominating the skyline. 

At the far end one finds bulky luxury residential buildings and a great number of dogs patronizing the pet care parlors that serve the pure-bred loving populations of Kips Bay, which is the name of both the neighborhood and its eponymous bend in the East River where 34th Street ends.  At the riverbank are the FDR Drive, the East River Greenway for bicycling to the south end of Manhattan, a small parking lot for New York University, the East 34th Street Ferry Landing (NY Waterway, SeaStreak), and the East 34th Street Heliport.

The New York Post listed one part of the street – the block of between Sixth and Seventh Avenues – as one of "the most dangerous blocks in the city" because police crime statistics for 2015 showed that 44 burglaries and 244 grand larcenies had been reported there, more property theft than for any other city block.

Attractions 
Places located along or within one block of 34th Street include (from west to east):
Jacob K. Javits Convention Center
Hudson Yards buildings
Congregation Beth Israel West Side Jewish Center
Manhattan Center
Hammerstein Ballroom
New Yorker Hotel
One Penn Plaza
New York City Pennsylvania Station
Macy's Herald Square
Mercy College (New York)
Herald Square
Empire State Building
B. Altman and Company Building, housing the City University of New York Graduate Center
Madison Belmont Building
Sy Syms School of Business
New York Estonian House
St. Vartan Cathedral
Rusk Institute of Rehabilitation Medicine of New York University Medical Center

Public transportation 
Pennsylvania Station is located on 33rd Street, one block south, between Seventh and Eighth Avenues.

New York City Bus's  and  buses run west–east across 34th Street.

The following New York City Subway stations serve 34th Street:
34th Street–Hudson Yards (IRT Flushing Line); serving the 
34th Street–Penn Station (IND Eighth Avenue Line); serving the 
34th Street–Penn Station (IRT Broadway–Seventh Avenue Line); serving the 
34th Street Herald Square; serving the 
33rd Street (IRT Lexington Avenue Line); serving the 

In addition, the following PATH station serves 34th Street:
33rd Street; serving the JSQ–33, JSQ–33 (via HOB), and HOB–33 trains

In the past, three of the four former IRT elevated lines had a station at 34th Street:

34th Street on the IRT Second Avenue Line
34th Street on the IRT Third Avenue Line
34th Street on the IRT Ninth Avenue Line

The fourth station was a spur over 34th Street from the Third Avenue Line to the East 34th Street Ferry Landing.

See also 

 Manhattan streets, 23-42
 Miracle on 34th Street
 Koreatown
 Kips Bay

References

External links 

34th Street Partnership, 34thstreet.org
New York Songlines: 34th Street, a virtual walking tour

 
034
Kips Bay, Manhattan
Midtown Manhattan
Murray Hill, Manhattan
Streets in Manhattan